The Missouri Christian School Athletic Association is the sports governing body for independent Christian schools in the state of Missouri.

History 
The Missouri Christian School Athletic Association (MCSAA) was established in 1995 "to provide a comprehensive state-wide competitive program of athletics in a Christian environment." MCSAA currently has 43 member schools. Tim Asher is the Executive Director.

Athletics 
The MCSAA sanctions the following sports:

 Boys Baseball
Boys/Girls Basketball
 Boys/Girls Cross Country
Cheer
 Boys/Girls Soccer
 Boys/Girls Track and Field
 Girls Volleyball

Tournaments 
The organization conducts three seasons of sports tournaments for its 40 current member schools:

Fall Tournaments 

Boys Cross Country
Girls Cross Country
Boys Soccer
Girls Volleyball

Winter Tournaments 

Boys Basketball
Girls Basketball
Cheer

Spring Tournaments 

Boys Baseball
Girls Soccer
Boys Track and field
Girls Track and field

All tournaments take place in Joplin, Missouri.  The tournament history dates to 1995.

Member Schools

Aurora Christian Academy - Aurora, Missouri
Berean Christian Academy - Monett, Missouri
Blue Ridge Christian School - Kansas City, Missouri
Center Place Restoration School - Independence, Missouri
Christian Academy of Greater St. Louis - St. Louis, Missouri
Christian Fellowship School  - Columbia, Missouri
Christian Learning Center - Fort Scott, Kansas
Christian Ministries Academy - Billings, Missouri
Clinton Christian Academy - Clinton, Missouri
Community Christian Academy - Barnhart, Missouri
Crosspoint Christian School - Villa Ridge, Missouri
The Daniel Academy - Kansas City, Missouri 
Eagle Ridge Christian School - Cape Girardeau, Missouri
El Dorado Christian School - El Dorado Springs, Missouri
Faith Christian Academy - Kansas City, Missouri
Fort Scott Christian Heights - Fort Scott, Kansas
Harrisonville Classical Christian Academy - Harrisonville, Missouri
Heartland Christian Academy - Bethel, Missouri
Heartland Christian School - Belton, Missouri
Heritage Classical Christian Academy - Fenton, Missouri
Lighthouse Christian Academy - Seneca, Missouri
Lighthouse Preparatory Academy - Jefferson City, Missouri
Liberty Christian Academy - Wright City, Missouri
Maranatha Baptist Academy - St. Robert, Missouri
Marian Hope Academy - Blue Springs, Missouri
Maryville Christian School - Maryville, Illinois
North County Christian School - Florissant, Missouri
Overland Christian School - Overland Park, Kansas
Outreach Christian Education - Kansas City, Missouri
Our Savior Christian Academy -  Smithville, Missouri
Ozarks Christian Academy - West Plains, Missouri
Plaza Heights Christian Academy - Blue Springs, Missouri
Providence Classical Christian Academy - St. Louis, Missouri
Rivers of Life Christian School - Granite City, Illinois
Round Grove Christian Academy - Miller, Missouri
Show-Me Christian School - La Monte, Missouri
South Park Christian Academy - St. Joseph, Missouri
Tower Grove Christian Academy - St. Louis, Missouri
The Training Center - Garden City, Missouri
Trinity Christian Academy - Hollister, Missouri
Victory Christian Academy -  Arnold, Missouri
Victory Road Christian Academy - Anderson, Missouri
Westwood Baptist Academy - Poplar Bluff, Missouri

References

External links

Organizations based in Missouri
Sports governing bodies in the United States